Vladimir Ardalionovich Malygin (born 19 June 1950) is a Russian diplomat. He has served in various diplomatic roles since the 1970s, and was the Ambassador of Russia to Malta between December 2014 and October 2021.

Career
Vladimir Malygin studied at the Moscow State Institute of International Relations, graduating in 1972 and beginning work for the Soviet Ministry of Foreign Affairs. His work included postings within the central apparatus of the Ministry, which after the dissolution of the Soviet Union in 1991 became the Russian Ministry of Foreign Affairs, and abroad. During the Soviet and later Russian periods he worked in the embassies in Sweden, the United Kingdom, and Cyprus. He undertook further studies at the Diplomatic Academy of the Ministry of Foreign Affairs, graduating in 1989. On 18 September 1996 he was awarded the diplomatic rank of Extraordinary and Plenipotentiary Envoy 2nd class.

In 2000 Malygin was appointed Deputy Director of the Ministry's General Secretariat, followed by a posting from 2003 as consul general in Edinburgh. He held this post until 2009, having received the diplomatic rank of Extraordinary and Plenipotentiary Envoy 1st class, on 29 December 2005. Between 2009 and 2012 he was Deputy Director of the Ministry's Department of Security, and then from 2012 until 2014 Malygin was consul general in Klaipeda, Lithuania. He then became Deputy Director of the Ministry's Second European Department in June 2014, before being appointed Ambassador of Russia to Malta on 12 December 2014. He served in this role until his retirement on 29 October 2021.

Personal life and awards
In addition to his native Russian, Malygin speaks English and Swedish. He is married to Tatyana, and currently holds the diplomatic rank of Ambassador Extraordinary and Plenipotentiary, awarded on 17 October 2016.

References 

1950 births
Living people
Moscow State Institute of International Relations alumni
Diplomatic Academy of the Ministry of Foreign Affairs of the Russian Federation alumni
Ambassador Extraordinary and Plenipotentiary (Russian Federation)
Ambassadors of Russia to Malta
Recipients of the Medal of the Order "For Merit to the Fatherland" II class